Kamisama Kiss is a 2012 Japanese anime television series based on the manga series of the same name written and illustrated by Julietta Suzuki. The anime was produced by TMS Entertainment and directed by Akitaro Daichi. It ran from October 1, 2012, to December 24, 2012, on TV Tokyo. The 17th issue of Hakusensha's Hana to Yume magazine announced in August 2014 that the manga series inspired a second anime season, which aired from January 5, 2015 to March 30, 2015.

There are two OVA episodes, which first aired on August 26, 2013, bundled with the 16th volume of the manga. One of the included episodes is based on the story from the 15th volume, while the other contains an all-new original story. A four-part original animation DVD (OAD) known as  began airing on August 20, 2015, and is based on the "past arc" of the series, spanning from the 14th through 17th volumes of the manga series. A new OAD, previously announced as Kamisama, Kekkon Zenya, released as Kamisama, Shiawase ni Naru was bundled with the Kamisama Hajimemashita 25.5 official fanbook on December 20, 2016.

The anime has been licensed for streaming by Funimation Entertainment.

Series overview

Episode list

Season 1 (2012)

Season 2 (2015)

OVAs

Kako-hen

Shiawase ni Naru

References

Kamisama Kiss